The 1929–30 season was Galatasaray SK's 26th in existence and the club's 19th consecutive season in the Istanbul Football League.

Squad statistics

Squad changes for the 1929–1930 season

In:

Competitions

Istanbul Football League

Standings

Matches

Kick-off listed in local time (EEST)

İstanbul Shield
Kick-off listed in local time (EEST)

Friendly Matches

References
 Atabeyoğlu, Cem. 1453-1991 Türk Spor Tarihi Ansiklopedisi. page(587).(1991) An Grafik Basın Sanayi ve Ticaret AŞ
 Tekil, Süleyman. Dünden bugüne Galatasaray(1983). Page(176-177). Arset Matbaacılık Kol.Şti.

External links
 Galatasaray Sports Club Official Website 
 Turkish Football Federation - Galatasaray A.Ş. 
 uefa.com - Galatasaray AŞ

Galatasaray S.K. (football) seasons
Turkish football clubs 1929–30 season
1920s in Istanbul
1930s in Istanbul